The Diplomatic Academy was part of the Foreign and Commonwealth Office (FCO) of the United Kingdom. It was renamed the International Academy following the merger of the FCO and the Department for International Development (DFID) in September 2020 to form the new Foreign, Commonwealth and Development Office (FCDO).

The creation of a new Diplomatic Academy was announced in a speech by William Hague, Secretary of State for Foreign and Commonwealth Affairs, on 19 September 2013 on the occasion of the opening of the FCO's new Language Centre.  The Academy began operating in 2014 and was opened officially by Foreign Secretary Philip Hammond on 10 February 2015. The Academy was a Directorate of the FCO. The first Director of the Academy (2014–17) was Jon Davies. His successor as Director (2017-20) was Jon Benjamin.

The  Academy was originally structured into 11 thematic areas, or "Faculties": These were: International Policy, Diplomatic Practice, States and Societies, Understanding the UK, Consular and Crisis Management, Economics and Prosperity, Europe, Multilateral, Security Defence and Intelligence, Law, and Languages. A twelfth Faculty - Trade Policy and Negotiations - was added in 2016 after the UK vote to leave the European Union.

In 2017 the  Academy absorbed further internal responsibilities for management and leadership training and for the FCO's overseas network of Regional Learning & Development Teams, which became the Diplomatic Academy Regional Teams (DARTs).  The Diplomatic Academy became the principal learning and development (L&D) organisation of the FCO.

The administrative offices and training rooms of what is now the International Academy are located in the main building of the FCDO in King Charles Street, London.  A new learning facility named the Mayhew Theatre (after Baroness Cicely Mayhew, the UK's first woman diplomat) was officially opened on 4 March 2019 by Prince William, Duke of Cambridge. The theatre was given this name following a vote of FCO staff.

The  Academy's face-to-face and online programmes are aimed at FCDO employees and employees of other UK government departments and agencies who are working in international roles.  It does not offer external enrolment on face-to-face courses, but it has experimented with the concept of the Massive Open Online Course and has released two public courses. The first, entitled Diplomacy in the 21st Century, was developed with the Open University and ran on the FutureLearn platform in January–March and May-July 2019 with over 13,500 registrations in total. A second course entitled Introduction to British Diplomacy ran in February and May 2020.

References 

2014 establishments in the United Kingdom
Diplomatic training